Walter Skinner (by 1515 – 1554 or later) was an English politician.

He was a Member (MP) of the Parliament of England for Newport, Cornwall in 1545.

References

Year of death missing
English MPs 1545–1547
Members of the pre-1707 English Parliament for constituencies in Cornwall
Year of birth uncertain